The 2018 VTB United League Final Four was the 4th final four tournament of the VTB United League, a regional European club basketball competition. The tournament is held in the VTB Ice Palace in Moscow, Russia. The four winners of the play-offs during the 2017–18 VTB United League qualified for the Final Four. The tournament will be hosted between 8 June and 10 June 2018.

The last final four was held in 2012, as the league was decided through playoff series in the previous years. Khimki, the runners-up of the Final Four, qualified for the 2018–19 EuroLeague (as CSKA Moscow was already qualified).

Bracket

Semifinals

Third place game

Final

References

2017–18 VTB United League